ATP Records may refer to:
ATP World Tour records, a list of records related to the Association of Tennis Professionals
ATP Recordings, a British record label